Elections were held in Northumberland County, Ontario, on October 24, 2022, in conjunction with municipal elections across the province.

Northumberland County Council
The Northumberland County Council consists of the seven mayors of its constituent municipalities.

Alnwick/Haldimand
The following were the results for mayor of Alnwick/Haldimand.

Brighton
Mayor Brian Ostrander was challenged by municipal councillor Doug LeBlanc.

Cobourg
The following were the results for mayor of Cobourg.

Cramahe
Mayor Mandy Martin was re-elected by acclamation.

Hamilton
Scott Jibb was elected mayor of Hamilton by acclamation.

Port Hope
Mayor Bob Sanderson did not run for re-election.

The following were the results for mayor of Port Hope.

Trent Hills
The following were the results for mayor of Trent Hills.

References

Northumberland
Northumberland County, Ontario